Libreflix is a free online Brazilian service that offers access to audiovisual productions with permissive distribution licenses through streaming. The platform is open and its development is done collaboratively  and it is open source, following the philosophy of free software.

History
The service went live in 11 August 2017  and can be accessed through the official website or applications for Windows and Android systems.

Although the service does not require registration to be accessed, in April 2018 the platform had 14 thousand registered users. Registration is mandatory for sending movie suggestions. 

The Libreflix, initially designed and developed by Brazilian hacktivist Guilmour Rossi, is written in Node.js and licensed under the GNU Affero General Public License. The development is done using git versioning through a public repository.

In July 2018 the service was presented at the 18th Fórum Internacional Software Livre.

Collection
The service catalogue includes feature films, short films and series, whether fictional or not. In a presentation in July 2018, the service listed more than 250 works registered in the collection, where 75% of the catalog was of non-fictional works. By location, 62% of the content was produced in Brazil, 8% in the rest of Latin America. American and European works represented 17% and 8% of the catalogue respectively. As for the duration of the content, 40% was composed of feature films.

Article

References

External links

Official website
Source-code at libregit.org

Video on demand services
Brazilian websites
Free network-related software